
Gmina Tuplice is a rural gmina (administrative district) in Żary County, Lubusz Voivodeship, in western Poland.

The gmina contains part of the protected area called Muskau Bend Landscape Park.

Villages
Gmina Tuplice contains the villages and settlements of Chełmica, Chlebice, Cielmów, Czerna, Drzeniów, Grabów, Grabówek, Gręzawa, Jagłowice, Łazy, Matuszowice, Nowa Rola, Świbinki and Tuplice.

Neighbouring gminas
Gmina Tuplice is bordered by the gminas of Brody, Jasień, Lipinki Łużyckie, Lubsko and Trzebiel.

Twin towns – sister cities

Gmina Tuplice is twinned with:
 Döbern, Germany

References

Tuplice
Villages in Żary County